The Expedition to Mostaganem of 1547 was a failed Spanish expedition mounted against Mostaganem by the Spanish forces of Count Alcaudete.

In 1543 a Spanish expedition was led against Mostaganem by the Spanish forces of Count Alcaudete numbering between 5,000 to 7,000 men, this expedition was defeated. A second expedition was mounted against Mostaganem in 1547. Count Alcaudete marched from Tlemcen and arrived at Mostaganem on the 21st of August which he then laid siege to. There was only 40 men to defend the city, however the Spanish attack was defeated. Another Spanish expedition against the city was defeated in 1558.

See also
Expedition to Mostaganem (1543)
Expedition to Mostaganem (1558)

References 

16th century in Algeria
Battles involving Algeria
1547 in Spain
Battles involving Spain